Jackson-Madison County School System (JMCSS) or Jackson-Madison County School District is a school district headquartered in Jackson, Tennessee. It serves, in addition to the city, the rest of Madison County.  the enrollment was over 13,000.

In 2015, Verna Ruffin, the superintendent at the time, proposed "Vision 2020" which would be a plan to help the school system. The result of the plan being passed resulted in 5 schools closing. Nova Elementary School, Beech Bluff Elementary School, Malesus Elementary School, Tigrett Middle School, and Jackson Central-Merry High School.

, the county government funded the district's budget.

Jackson-Madison County School System's current superintendent is Dr. Marlon King

In 2020, it was announced that Jackson Central-Merry would reopen as a middle and high school. In 2021, it was reopened as JCM 6-12 or Middle and High School.

As of 2021, JMCSS has 24 schools.10 elementary schools, 2 K-8 schools, 1 preschool, 4 middle schools, 5 high schools, 1 6-12 school, and 1 all-virtual school.

Elementary schools
Alexander Elementary School
Andrew Jackson Elementary School
Arlington Elementary School
Denmark Elementary School
East Elementary School
Isaac Lane Elementary School
Jackson Career and Technology Elementary School
Lincoln Elementary School
South Elementary School
Thelma Barker Elementary School

Kindergarten to 8th grade schools
Community Montessori
Pope School
Rose Hill School

Preschools
Nova Early Learning School (formerly Nova Elementary School)

Middle schools
North Parkway Middle School
Northeast Middle School
West Bemis Middle School

High schools
Jackson Central-Merry Early College High School
Madison Academic Magnet High School
North Side High School
South Side High School
Liberty Technology Magnet High School

6-12 grade schools
Jackson Central-Merry 6-12 (formerly Jackson Central-Merry High School)

All-virtual schools
Jackson Academic Steam Academy (created in 2021)

References

External links
 Jackson-Madison County School System

School districts in Tennessee
Education in Madison County, Tennessee